Michael Simon Fitch (born February 26, 1999) is an American soccer player who plays as a defender for USL League One club Richmond Kickers.

Career

Youth, college and amateur
Fitch attended St. Christopher's School, leading the team to the Virginia Independent Schools Athletic Association State Championship in 2016, serving as team captain for three years, and was a High School Honor Roll member. During 2016 and 2017, he also played club soccer with Richmond United.

In 2017, Fitch went to George Washington University to play college soccer. He made 18 appearances for the Colonials, before transferring to Virginia Commonwealth University in 2018. With the Rams, Fitch went on to make 63 appearances, scoring five goals and tallying four assists. He earned Atlantic 10 All-Academic Team honors in four consecutive seasons.

While at college, Fitch also played in the USL League Two with Lionsbridge FC. The 2020 season was cancelled due to the COVID-19 pandemic, but made four appearances and scored a single goal in the 2021 season.

Professional
On February 23, 2022, Fitch signed with USL League One club Richmond Kickers. He made his professional debut on April 25, 2022, appearing as an injury-time substitute during a 2–1 win over Charlotte Independence.

References

External links
 

1999 births
Living people
American soccer players
Association football defenders
George Washington Colonials men's soccer players
Lionsbridge FC players
People from Richmond, Virginia
Richmond Kickers players
Soccer players from Virginia
USL League One players
USL League Two players
VCU Rams men's soccer players